The British Rail Class 125 was a design of three car Diesel Multiple Unit built by BR Derby at Derby Works in 1958. They were almost identical in appearance to the Class 116.

History 
The Class 125 was built in 1958 at Derby Works as high capacity suburban railcars specifically for the Lea Valley Lines near Stratford. They were fitted with powerful Rolls-Royce engines, allowing them to have comparable performance to contemporary EMUs.They bore a close resemblance to the similar class 116, which were also built by British Rail at Derby. The Class 125 had a unique multiple working code (orange star), due to their unique pneumatic, rather than electric, engine control system. They also had a non-standard jumper cable arrangement and were therefore incompatible with other British Rail diesel multiple unit classes. They were withdrawn in 1977 and like many other first generation DMUs, never wore their  Class 125 TOPS classifications.

Operational history 
The class 125 entered service in 1958, replacing steam trains on the lines they served.

The Class 125 operated semi-fast suburban services on the Lea valley lines until their electrification in 1969, after which they were replaced by EMUs. They also operated commuter services on the West Anglia Main Line. These services were operated alongside locomotive hauled trainsets until the line was also electrified in 1969, after which class 302 and 308 electric multiple units took over the newly electrified routes. The trains were then transferred onto the East Coast Main Line commuter services out of King's Cross, where they worked for the rest of their operational lifetimes.

Departmental use
Two trailers (59458 + 59466) were taken into departmental (non-revenue earning) service in November 1982 and March 1984 as 975993 + 975964. They were used at the Railway Technical Centre in Derby and used as fire test vehicles. They were both withdrawn and scrapped in February 1986 and August 1988.

Withdrawal and Scrapping 
The Class 125s were withdrawn from ECML commuter routes in 1977, following the electrification of the ECML. They were then scrapped after a brief time in storage. No class 125 units survive to this day, as they were withdrawn before the interest in preserving multiple units began.

Numbering

Liveries
They were delivered in an unlined medium shade of Brunswick green with white cab roofs and yellow speed whiskers. The whiskers were replaced during the early 1960s by split yellow warning panels, one either side of the central character train describer which remained green.

During the mid 1960s rail blue appeared, and white cab roofs were gradually dispensed with and buffer beams became black. Initially the yellow warning panels were expanded to cover the complete lower front of the driving cabs and later the whole cab fronts became yellow.

References
 History of the Class 125s
 Brian Golding (1995). A Pictorial Record of British Railways Diesel Multiple Units. Chinnor: Cheona Publications. .
 Brian Morrison (1995). British Rail DMUs & Diesel Railcars: Origins & First Generation Stock. Ian Allan. .

125
Train-related introductions in 1959